Acrobasis ereboscopa is a species of snout moth in the genus Acrobasis. It was described by Oswald Bertram Lower in 1903, and is known from Australia.

References

Moths described in 1903
Acrobasis
Moths of Australia